Alberts Vaters (29 September 1905 – 3 November 1928) was a Latvian football forward and midfielder who played five international matches for the Latvia national football team in 1928, shortly before his death.

Biography

Vaters was known as a sportsman in Latvia since 1921, however his career in football really took off in 1925 when he played with JKS Riga which in that year finished second in the top Riga football league (Vaters was more of a reserves player then though). The following season was less successful for JKS and at the end of it Vaters moved to a stronger side - LSB Riga. In 1926 he also played in several matches for the Riga garrison selected team alongside more famous footballers like Arvīds Jurgens, Pēteris Lauks, Arvīds Bārda and Arkādijs Pavlovs.

In 1927 Vaters was called up to the national team for a friendly match against Sweden, however he wasn't chosen to play in the match. Still Vaters played for the Riga selected team in several matches.

In 1928 Vaters was chosen to play in the national team in the Baltic Cup and in the first game of the tournament against Lithuania he scored two goals, thus making one of the brightest débuts in the history of the national team. After coming out victorious from the Baltic Cup Vaters also capped in the next 3 international friendlies for Latvia in 1928.

In the autumn of 1928 Vaters left LSB Riga and joined Vanderer Riga, but he did not appear in any matches for the side as he was giving away to a cocaine addiction and he died of an overdose on 3 November 1928.

Statistics

International

International goals
''As of match played 23 September 1928. Latvia score listed first, score column indicates score after each Vaters goal.

Honours

Club
LSB Riga
Riga Football Cup: 1926

References

Latvian footballers
Latvia international footballers
1905 births
1928 deaths
Association football forwards
Association football midfielders